Paul Motian and the Electric Bebop Band is an album of bebop jazz standards by American drummer Paul Motian originally released on the German JMT label. It was the first release by the Electric Bebop Band, which featured the veteran drummer working mainly with younger musicians and which subsequently became one of Motian's primary groups until the end of his life.

Recorded in 1992, it was released in 1993 and features performances by Motian with tenor saxophonist Joshua Redman, guitarists Brad Shepik and Kurt Rosenwinkel, and bass guitarist Stomu Takeishi. The album was rereleased on the Winter & Winter label in 2004.

Reception
The AllMusic review by Scott Yanow awarded the album 4 stars, stating, "these versions are often a bit outside, a touch rock-ish, and quite unpredictable".

Track listing
 "Shaw-Nuff" (Ray Brown, Gil Fuller, Dizzy Gillespie) - 6:05 
 "I Waited for You" (Fuller, Gillespie) - 5:20 
 "Dance of the Infidels" (Bud Powell) - 4:08 
 "Darn That Dream" (Jimmy Van Heusen, Eddie DeLange) - 3:58 
 "Hot House" (Tadd Dameron) - 6:53 
 "Dizzy Atmosphere" (Gillespie) - 2:47 
 "Scrapple from the Apple" (Charlie Parker) - 5:07 
 "Scrapple from the Apple" (Parker) - 5:01 
 "Monk's Dream" (Thelonious Monk) - 6:07 
 "52nd Street Theme" (Monk) - 3:36 
Recorded at the Power Station in New York City in April 1992

Personnel
 Paul Motian - drums
 Joshua Redman - tenor saxophone
 Brad Schoeppach - electric guitar (left side)
 Kurt Rosenwinkel - electric guitar (right side)
 Stomu Takeishi - electric bass

References 

1993 albums
Paul Motian albums
JMT Records albums
Winter & Winter Records albums